Heritage Valley Kennedy (formerly Ohio Valley Hospital) is a not-for-profit hospital in Kennedy Township,  Pennsylvania. Its postal address is 25 Heckel Road, McKees Rocks, Pennsylvania 15136. Ohio Valley serves Pittsburgh's western suburbs, including the townships of Kennedy, Robinson, Moon and Findlay, and the municipalities of McKees Rocks, Oakdale, Crafton, Ingram, Imperial and Coraopolis. It is also described as being located in McKees Rocks.

The hospital is a 124-bed facility that includes medical/surgical beds, critical care beds, intermediate care beds, Orthopedic Unit beds, and acute rehabilitation beds.

It has a Wound Care Center, a Pain Treatment Center, a Senior Living Community, and a Cataract & Eye Care Center.

The hospital includes a School of Nursing operated in conjunction with California University of Pennsylvania and a School of Radiography in conjunction with La Roche College.

School of Nursing
The Ohio Valley Hospital School of Nursing offers a 20-month, 27 college credit, and 45 nursing credit program.  The program includes clinical experiences in other local hospitals.

History
The hospital was founded in the 1890s as McKees Rocks General Hospital by Dr. Samuel McCune Black, who owned it for a few years before transferring it to a public association in 1902.

A Miss Annabell McAnulty was the first nurse to graduate from the nursing program in 1904.

The hospital officially became known as Ohio Valley General Hospital in 1906, when it was located in Norwood, a neighborhood of Stowe Township, Pennsylvania.  It moved to its present location in Kennedy Township in 1949.

In 1930, the Sisters of the Holy Family of Nazareth, took over management of the hospital, keeping it a non-sectarian, community hospital.

Ohio Valley Hospital moved to its current location, the former Heckel farm in Kennedy Township, in 1949. Its School of Nursing expanded there in 1959, and its School of Radiography formed in 1963.

The hospital's Medical Office Building opened in 1988. Its campus expanded to include a Wound Care Center, Pain Treatment Center, and senior living facilities in 2000.

In 2014, the hospital rebranded to become Ohio Valley Hospital, adding a modern look to its community image.

Ohio Valley Hospital is also an owner of Northwest EMS Ambulance Service.

As of 2019, Ohio Valley Hospital is now a subsidiary of Heritage Valley Health System.  On October 11, 2019, Heritage Valley Health System formally announced that Ohio Valley Hospital is now called Heritage Valley Kennedy as part of the hospital's integration into the health system.

Notable births
Michael Keaton

References

External links
 

Hospitals in Pennsylvania
Hospitals established in 1906
1906 establishments in Pennsylvania